The Hearst Media Production Group (formerly Litton Syndications and Litton Entertainment) is an American media and production company based in New York City, New York as a division of the Hearst Television subsidiary of Hearst Communications, with three additional offices in Boston, Washington, D.C., and Burbank, California. Many of HMPG's programs comply with federally mandated educational and informational requirements.

History

Early history (1988–2011)
The company was formed in 1988 as Litton Syndications by Dave Morgan in Baltimore. Its first syndicated productions were a series of one-off, sports-related specials. The programs were bought from other companies.

In the 1990s, seeing a growing market for educational programs due to the enactment of the Children's Television Act, requiring television stations to air a weekly quota of educational programs, Litton began to syndicate Jack Hanna's Animal Adventures. In 1993, the company was moved to Charleston, South Carolina, while maintaining a production base in Burbank, California. Litton has maintained a long-time business relationship with Jack Hanna with three more later series throughout the 2000s and 2010s, only ending actively in 2021 with Hanna's retirement; HMPG will continue to distribute his shows indefinitely.

In 2005, the company changed its name from Litton Syndications to Litton Entertainment. Adding to its outside syndication library that included Baywatch in May 2007, Litton purchased from Peace Arch Entertainment Group syndication rights to 85 movies in the Castle Hill library. The low budget films were bundled into 4 groups and was the company's first move into syndicating movies. By 2008, LE had syndicated rights to three off-MTV shows, Cribs, Pimp My Ride and Date My Mom, while adding that year, Storm Stories from The Weather Channel. In 2009-10, Litton offered the nontraditional court show Street Court.

In January 2011, Litton distributed the hip-hop newsmagazine Direct Access (hosted by Darian "Big Tigger" Morgan) from WDCW/Washington, D.C. to fellow Tribune Broadcasting stations and Weigel Broadcasting's WCIU-TV/Chicago.

Involvement in network E/I blocks (2011–2017)
In May 2011, following the announcement of plans to discontinue the ABC Kids Saturday morning block, Litton reached a deal with ABC's affiliate board to syndicate a block of live-action, E/I (educational and informative) compliant programming, known as Litton's Weekend Adventure. The block premiered on September 3, 2011.

On September 28, 2013, Litton introduced its second Saturday morning network television block, CBS Dream Team, for CBS; focusing on teenagers 13 to 16 years old. The block succeeded CBS' previous block, Cookie Jar TV. Recipe Rehab was one preexisting program Litton moved over from its ABC block.

The company planned to double its productions by adding production facilities in South Carolina. Litton began renting and renovation a North Charleston studio used with its first-ever scripted production, The Inspectors, also being its first series produced there. LE's first film produced in that studio was the independent film The Ivy League Farmer, which began filming in September. Additionally, Litton planned to build its own studio complex with multiple stages somewhere in the state. Production of most of Litton's productions should move there also.

In 2014, Ocean Mysteries With Jeff Corwin won two Daytime Creative Arts Emmy Awards for Outstanding Travel Program and Outstanding Directing in a Lifestyle/Culinary/Travel Program. On October 4, 2014, Litton introduced its third Saturday morning block, One Magnificent Morning, for The CW, succeeding Saban Brands' Vortexx block.

For the 2016-17 season, Litton launched two additional E/I programming blocks. On April 27, 2015, Litton announced Go Time, a syndicated block of E/I programming drawn largely from reruns of programming from its other network blocks, which launched on October 1, 2016. On February 24, 2016, Litton and NBC announced The More You Know, which launched on October 8, 2016, succeeding NBC Kids.

Acquisition by Hearst and rebranding as HMPG (2017–present)
On January 6, 2017, Hearst Television, a division of Hearst Communications and a former employer of company founder Dave Morgan, announced that it had acquired a majority stake in Litton for an undisclosed amount, a deal closed on February 1, 2017. On January 25, 2017, Litton and Tribune Media announced a deal for the 2017–18 season where they will provide E/I content for Tribune's Antenna TV network. In the 2017-18 season, NBC's The More You Know block also began to be carried on NBC's classic television subchannel network, Cozi TV. On January 6, 2018, Telemundo's block, MiTelemundo, was relaunched to carry programs from NBC's The More You Know block, in Spanish. The block, however, kept its original name.

On September 7, 2021, after fully acquiring Litton's balance that year, Hearst Television announced that the former would be moved under a new unified banner for the latter's outside productions, including Matter of Fact with Soledad O'Brien. On January 28, 2022, it was revealed that the name of Hearst Television's newly-rebranded unified division will be Hearst Media Production Group, and a new logo and production card were also unveiled for the new banner.

On March 3, 2022, HMPG made a deal with Toonz Media Group, in which the former will co-produce animated productions with the latter, including Paddypaws, Sunnyside Billy, Kingdom of None and Aliens in My Backpack, and distribute them in the United States.

Former divisions
Litton formerly had three operating divisions:
Litton Worldwide Distribution
Litton Media Sales
Litton News Source provides stations with reports and features from Consumer Reports magazine, Consumer Reports TV and Consumer Alert News Network (Hearst itself had previously partnered with Consumer Reports in the 90s and 2000s for national wire stories). Previous programming included Brighter Living With Jill Cordes, BusinessWeek Reports From Wall Street, Standard & Poor's Customized Reports, Consumer Reports "Good Housekeeping Reports" and seasonal specials, "Solutions With Jill", "BusinessWeek Custom Wall Street Reports", "S&P Custom Market Indices"

First run syndicated

Programming blocks

Go Time
Go Time is a syndicated E/I-compliant block of six programs previously aired on the network blocks from Litton and Hearst Media, which is cleared throughout 80% of the United States. Sony Pictures Television sells advertising for the block in lieu of Litton.

On April 27, 2015, Litton announced Go Time block would launch on October 1, 2016, with CBS News and Stations's independent stations as its major body of stations, along with Gray Television and Sinclair Broadcast Group to carry the block. Other groups carrying it are Cowles, Cox, Hearst Television, NPG, Scripps, Nexstar, and Weigel Broadcasting.

Current Go Time programming
 Rock The Park - hosted by Jack Steward and Colton Smith (previously aired on ABC and The CW from 2014 to 2021)
 Did I Mention Invention?  - hosted by Alie Ward (also aired on The CW from 2018 to 2020)
 Jewels of the Natural World (also aired on The CW in the summer of 2020)
Hearts of Heroes (also airing on ABC since 2019)

Stand alone programs
Jack Hanna's Animal Adventures (1993–2008), half-hour nature show; continues to be distributed
The Wildlife Docs (2013–2018), half-hour exotic animal vet show
Animal Exploration with Jarod Miller (2007–2010), half-hour nature show
NASCAR Angels, inspirational automotive rehabilitation reality show co-produced with NASCAR
BusinessWeek TV, half-hour financial news, discontinued with purchase of magazine by Bloomberg L.P.
Home Team, inspirational time-compressed home improvement project reality show
Ask Rita, a comedy based talk show strip hosted by comedian Rita Rudner
Storm Stories, syndicated distribution of Weather Channel weather event series
 Ready, Set, Pet, hosted by Phil Torres

Notes

External links 

 
Hearst Communications assets
Hearst Television
Television production companies of the United States
Companies based in Charleston, South Carolina
American companies established in 1988
Mass media companies established in 1988
Television syndication distributors
1988 establishments in Maryland
2017 mergers and acquisitions